Helmer Jõgi (born 12 January 1952) is an Estonian politician. He was a member of X and XI Riigikogu.

Jõgi was born in Tartu and graduated from Tartu State University in 1975 with a degree in mathematics.

References

1952 births
Living people
Estonian Coalition Party politicians
Estonian Reform Party politicians
Members of the Riigikogu, 2003–2007
Members of the Riigikogu, 2007–2011
Recipients of the Order of the White Star, 5th Class
University of Tartu alumni
Politicians from Tartu